{{Infobox person
| name          =  Lene Berg
| birth_date    = 
| birth_place   = Oslo, Norway
| death_date    = 
| death_place   = 
| occupation    = Director, author, artist
| years_active  = 1997–present
|notable_works = Kopfkino, Stalin by Picasso, False Belief, Fra Far (From Father)}}
Lene Berg (born 1965 in Oslo) is a Norwegian film director and artist, who works in Oslo and Berlin. Her artistic praxis includes film, installation, collage and text-based work. She has produced a number of projects in public spaces and directed four independently produced feature-length films.

Early life and education

Lene Berg was born in Oslo 1965, to sociologist Mie Berg Simonsen and film director Arnljot Berg. Growing up in Oslo, Berg attended the Oslo Waldorf School and Forsøksgymnaset in Oslo.  She graduated in 1992 with a degree in film directing from Dramatiska Institutet in Stockholm (University College of Film, Radio, Television and Theatre in Stockholm). Her debut full-length feature En Kvinnas Huvud (1997) was produced by Hinden/Länna-Ateljéerna AB.

Work

Media and style

Educated as a film director Berg integrates not only film, but also text and collage and installations in her work. Towards the late 1990s her work began to be shown in contemporary art venues. Berg's work is often characterized by a hybrid format, mixing genres, using different forms of media, narrative structures and artistic techniques, to investigate historical and political topics. A common theme in many of her projects is how a particular truth-notion is contingent, and how reality might be considered differently through the inclusion of additional stories, or a different perspective.

Notable projects

Encounter: Gentlemen & Arseholes

In the project Encounter: Gentlemen & Arseholes Berg reproduced the first edition of the literary magazine Encounter (magazine) from 1953 with her own notes and images inserted in between the pages of the magazine. These additional materials were collected from books, newspapers, private albums and conversations, and were not available to the public at the time of the original publication. The inserts shed new light on the CIA’s engagement in the Cultural Cold War, as expressed through the original magazine. The story of individuals engaged in the magazine is further expanded on in the film The Man in the Background.

The Man in the Background

In the film The Man in the Background Berg investigates the fate and role of Michael Josselson, director of the Congress for Cultural Freedom, in the Cold War era. The video material consists of Josselson's private super-8 footage from a vacation in 1958 and interviews with his widow Diana, nearly 50 years later. In 1966, the New York Times revealed that the Congress for Cultural Freedom had received funding from the CIA, and thus it was exposed that the Josselsons had lied to everyone in their surroundings for nearly two decades. The revelation changed the life of the Josselsons radically and painfully. Furthermore, the film poses questions about the other contributors to the magazine, their complicity and the scapegoating of the Josselsons.

Stalin by Picasso

Stalin by Picasso consists of a book and a film, as well as an outdoor banner, depicting the eponymous portrait, that she intended to hang on the facade of Folketeateret at Youngstorget in Oslo. The project received wide media attention when it turned out that the Norwegian Labour Party, represented by Martin Kolberg, had stopped the realization of the project. The banner was also part of Berg's exhibition at the Cooper Union for the Advancement of Science and Art in 2008, but again met strong reactions and was taken down without Berg's consent after only two days.

The original portrait was also met with harsh critique. The drawing was commissioned by Louis Aragon, the editor of the French communist party's weekly magazine Les Lettres Françaises. However, after much criticism from fellow party members and colleagues Aragon chose to distance himself from the portrait.

The project addresses the relationship between art and politics, free speech, and how art challenges political narratives and structures.

Kopfkino

The film Kopfkino consists of a series of stories told by eight women, seven of whom are BDSM sex workers, and one working as an actress. The women are gathered around a table, dressed as different female clichés of sexual fantasies, all are facing the camera, which slowly moves from person to person. The women share their stories and experiences and discuss the work they do or have done. Intimate details and descriptions of taboos bring to the front questions of forbidden sexual fantasies and the limits between sexual pleasure and violation. Ultimately the film asks what constitutes reality in a universe governed by fictional roles and games, like in BDSM.

In 2013, Kopfkino won the Best Documentary at the 8th Porn Film Festival in Berlin and the Art Critic's Award in Norway. It was also nominated for Best Documentary at the Amanda Award, Norway and Best Nordic Documentary at CPH:DOX, Denmark.

Dirty Young Loose

The film Dirty Young Loose shows three persons who are being interrogated, one after another, after they have acted together in a hotel room scene, one late evening. The tree characters enact three gendered stereotypes, encapsulated in the title; dirty man, young boy and loose (i.e. promiscuous) woman. It is unclear which characters have perpetrated what actions, and eventually also why they are being interrogated in the first place. The interrogators identities are never revealed or explained. The film poses questions around issues like authority, surveillance and truth. Based around and idea of so-called objective or neutral video recordings, the film scrutinizes the usage of images in media and judicial cases as proof of guilt, innocence, lies and truth. In 2013 Berg was part of the official Norwegian representation at the 55th International Art Exhibition, la Biennale di Venezia alongside Edvard Munch.

GOMP: Tales of Surveillance in Norway 1948-1989

In 2014, Lene Berg staged an event about the illegal surveillance of dissidents in Norway during the Cold War. Witnesses and actors testified about their personal experience of the political surveillance they had either been subject to or had executed. The event was conducted as a live television broadcast, an event Berg thought the Norwegian Broadcasting Corporation ought to have organized, but never did.

The project's subsequent film, GOMP: Tales of Surveillance in Norway 1948-1989, uses documentary and fictional elements to frame a piece of Norwegian and Cold War history seen through the eyes of the individuals involved on both sides.
GOMP and Dirty Young Loose, were both produced by Studio Fjordholm, the film production company of producer Helga Fjordholm.

Filmography

PublicationsGompen og andre beretninger om overvåking i Norge 1948 - 1989, 40 pages, illustrated, ed: Bo Krister Wahlström and Line Ulekleiv with texts by Nils Petter Gleditsch, Tormod Bakke and Wencke Mühleisen KORO/URO 2014Dirty Young Loose (Ung Løs Gris), booklet, 16 pages, illustrated, Studio Fjordholm 2013Lene Berg, exhibition catalogue, 100 pages, illustrated, ed: Caroline Ugelstad with texts by Sabeth Buchmann, Dieter Roelstraete and Katarina Gregos, Sternberg Press & Henie Onstad Kunstsenter 2012
Kopfkino, booklet, 34 pages, illustrated, Henie Onstad Kunstsenter 2012
Stalin by Picasso or Portrait of Woman with Moustache, 180 pages, illustrated, Oslo 2008 Encounter – Gentlemen & Arseholes, 160 pages with inlays, Berlin/Oslo 2006
Darwin in Warsaw, 96 pages, illustrated, Warsaw 2005
Picturing Hegel, Leporello, Stuttgart 2005

Awards and collections

Lene Berg has received several awards for her work including The Elephant Prize, Momentum/The Nordic Art Biennial; Lorck Schive Art Grant and The Royal Caribbean Art Grant. In 2019 her film False Belief has been nominated for the Teddy Award and the Amnesty Award. Her work has been acquired by Museum of Modern Art (MoMa), New York; National Museum of Art, Architecture and Design, Oslo and Henie Onstad Kunstsenter, as well as private collectors.

References 

Norwegian film directors
Norwegian women film directors
Norwegian artists
1965 births
Living people
Dramatiska Institutet alumni